Honeypot may refer to:

 A vessel (especially one made of pottery)  for storing honey

Biology 
 Honeypot ant, various ant species and their individual members
 Honeypot, flowering plant Protea cynaroides 
 Honeypot dryandra, flowering plant Banksia nivea

Metaphors evoking the use of honey as bait in a trap 
 Honey trapping, presenting romantic or sexual opportunity, as bait or as continuing motivation

Espionage using sexual/romantic "bait" 
 Recruitment of spies
 Honeypots in espionage fiction

"Sting" operations 
 Bait car, a vehicle used by law enforcement agencies to capture thieves
 Honeypot (computing), target presented to elicit hacking attempts

Titled works

Narrative works 
 The Honey Pot (1967), a 1967 film starring Rex Harrison and Susan Hayward
 The Honeypot, a 1920 British silent romance film
 "Honeypot" (Archer), episode of animated TV series Archer
 "The Honeypot" (Brooklyn Nine-Nine), episode of TV series Brooklyn Nine-Nine

Songs 
 "Honeypot", by Beat Happening on their eponymous album
 "Honeypot", by Rebelution on Peace of Mind album

Places 
 Honeypot Glen, area in Cheshire, Connecticut
 Honeypot Wood, site west of Dereham in Norfolk

Other uses 
 Honeypot, local name for a  patch of quicksand in Maine, U.S.
 Honeypot (tourism), particularly popular venue
 Honeypot Productions, theatre company

See also
 Honey (disambiguation)
 Honey bucket (disambiguation)

ja:ハニートラップ